Johanne Swanson, known by the stage name Yohuna, is a New York City-based musician. She released her debut album as Yohuna in 2016 on Orchid Tapes titled Patientness. The album received a 7.2 out of 10 rating from Pitchfork. Swanson released her second album on Orchid Tapes in 2019 titled Mirroring.

Discography
Studio albums
Patientness (2016, Orchid Tapes)
Mirroring (2019, Orchid Tapes)

References

Year of birth missing (living people)
Living people
American women pop singers
American women rock singers
American women in electronic music
21st-century American women